Wang Nan (born 7 October 1981 in Beijing, China) is a Chinese baseball player who was a member of Team China at the 2008 Summer Olympics.

Sports career
1997 Beijing Lucheng Sports School (Baseball);
1999 National Team;
2000 Beijing Municipal Team

Major performances
2002 Asian Games - 4th;
2003-2005 National League - 1st;
2005 Asian Championship - 3rd;
2005 National Games - 2nd

References
Profile 2008 Olympics Team China

1981 births
Living people
2006 World Baseball Classic players
Baseball players at the 2008 Summer Olympics
Chinese baseball players
Olympic baseball players of China
Baseball players from Beijing
Baseball players at the 2002 Asian Games
Asian Games competitors for China